HiPay is an independent global payment service provider based in France.

History 
HiPay Group is a former subsidiary of HiMedia Group that, in 2015, obtained authority from the French Government (Autorité des marchés financiers or AMF) for its Euronext index listing under ISIN code FR0012821916 and stock symbol HIPAY. This led to HiPay becoming an independent legal and stock exchange entity.

In 2015, HiPay reported a  consolidated net loss of €2.8 million and revenue of €25.8 million, a 12% increase from 2014.

In May 2016, BJ Invest became the majority shareholder of HiPay Group and now has a 29.83% capital investment.

In September 2016, HiPay inaugurated its developer portal.

Grégoire Bourdin was appointed chief executive officer of the group on December 15, 2016, succeeding Gabriel de Montessus. The Board of Directors was entirely reorganized following the investment of BJ Invest in the Group's capital, including the resignation of HiMedia SA represented by Cyril Zimmermann from his position as director. The Board is now composed of Benjamin Jayet (Chairman), Marianne Gosset (Director) and BJ Invest Director, represented by Loïc Jauson.

In 2016, HiPay closed the year with annual sales of 30.7 million euros, an increase of 19% from 2015.

In 2017, the revenue of HiPay reached €24.5 million (+28%) for an amount of €2.2 billion (+50%) transactions processed.

Then in 2018, the total revenues stood at €28.8 million up by 17%. This growth reflects the success of the commercial strategy of the company, well implemented and executed over the past two years, on both customer acquisition and supporting the growth of our existing portfolio, which enabled the company to process over €2.8 billion transactions in 2018 up by 30% vs 2017.

For 2019, HiPay announced a 37% transaction volume growth managed by its platform : €3 893 million and revenue increase of + 21% : €34.9 million.

Financial data

References

External links 
 Company website

Payment clearing systems
Companies listed on Euronext Paris